Robbery Under Arms is a 1957 British Western film directed by Jack Lee and starring Peter Finch and Ronald Lewis. It is based on the 1888 Australian novel Robbery Under Arms by Thomas Alexander Browne who wrote under the pseudonym Rolf Boldrewood.

Plot
In 1865 Australia, the two Marston brothers, bold Dick and sensitive Jim, are drawn into a life of crime by their ex-convict father Ben and his friend, the famous cattle thief Captain Starlight. They help take some cattle their father and Starlight have stolen across the country to Adelaide, where they are sold, with Starlight impersonating an English gentleman claiming to own the rustled herd.

The two brothers take their share of the money and go to Melbourne. On board ship, they meet the Morrison sisters: greedy Kate and nice Jean, who are romanced by Dick and Jim respectively. They read that Starlight has been arrested, and return home, where they and their father narrowly escape arrest.

The brothers are then reunited with Starlight, who has left prison, and join him and some other men in robbing a coach, in which a trooper is shot and killed. Dick and Jim go to the gold fields to make enough money to escape to America. There, they are reunited with Kate, who is married but is still interested in Dick, and Jean, who Jim marries.

Just as the brothers are about to leave to start a new life, Captain Starlight and his gang (including Ben Marston) arrive to rob the local bank. During the robbery, several people are killed by Starlight's gang (although not by Starlight), including a mother protecting child. Jim Marston is captured by locals and is about to be lynched, but is rescued by a trooper who comes to arrest him. Dick rescues Jim from the trooper, but is killed in the attempt.

Jim hides out with Starlight and his father, but misses his wife too much and goes back to see her. Starlight and Ben Marston are killed in a shoot out with police. Jim Marston is arrested.

Cast
 Peter Finch – Captain Starlight
 Ronald Lewis – Dick Marston
 Laurence Naismith – Ben Marston
 Maureen Swanson – Kate Morrison Mullockson
 David McCallum – Jim Marston
 Vincent Ball – George Storefield
 Jill Ireland – Jean Morrison
 Dudy Nimmo – Eileen Marston
 Jean Anderson – Ma Marston
 Ursula Finlay – Grace Storefield
 John Cadell – Warrigal, black rustler
 Larry Taylor – Burke, new rustler
 Russell Napier – Banker Green
 Max Wagner – Sergeant Goring
 Bartlett Mullins – Paddy
 Ewen Solon – Sergeant Arthur

Production

Development
Ealing Studios had planned to make the film after The Overlanders (1946) and Eureka Stockade (1949), and they hired William Lipscomb to do the script. Gregory Peck at one stage was announced as a possible star.

In June 1949 Ealing announced Ralph Smart would direct the film after Bitter Springs at an estimated budget of £250,000 with John McCallum as a possible star.

Ken G. Hall wanted to direct. However plans to make the film were hampered by the closing of Pagewood Studios. Leslie Norman was keen to produce.

Then in the mid 1950s director Jack Lee and Joe Janni had a big hit with the Australian-themed A Town Like Alice (1956), starring Peter Finch and written by Lipscomb. Rank put Lee and Janni under contract for two years and had Finch under contract. The three were reunited for the movie.

Peter Finch had made The Shiralee (1957) in Australia immediately before.

Jack Lee later said:
I made a mistake choosing Robbery Under Arms, a complicated Victorian novel with masses of plots and subplots and too much moralising. However I went ahead and chose the part for Peter Finch, who complained that he was overshadowed by everyone else, and in a way he was right. Janni and I weren't happy with the script and would have liked to put it off for another year. But we were under pressure from Rank and we had to go ahead with an inadequate script. There are one or two nice scenes in it but it's too slow and talky.
Vincent Ball said Finch suggested to Lee that Ball and Finch play the Marsden boys but John Davis "insisted that contract artistes be used for the leads". Ball agreed to play a smaller role if he could go to Australia. He was away "ten or eleven weeks" on salary to say one line in Australia filming the rest of his scenes at Pinewood.

Shooting
Shooting began in January 1957 on location in Australia at the Flinders Ranges, South Australia and near Bourke, New South Wales, with two days filming at Pagewood Studios. In April the unit moved to the UK where interiors and exteriors were shot at Pinewood studios in Buckinghamshire.

During the making of the film, on-screen couple David McCallum and Jill Ireland fell in love off screen as well, and married once they returned to England.

Reception
The film was popular at the Australian box office, although reviews were poor.

Variety called it:
A well-made, straightforward drama which should click okay in British houses. As is so often the case, its American impact will depend entirely on whether its stars are sufficient magnets to attract patrons outside the British domain. The picture is part of the Rank Organization’s current policy of spotlighting the Commonwealth. Its main problem is whether it does not follow a bit too soon after “The Shiralee,” which also starred Peter Finch and the wide, open Aussie spaces... The acting is less important than the situations. With fist- fights, gunfight and a near-lynching, there is plenty of* meat for good, solid thrills.
Filmink magazine said "there's no real theme or story uniting it all... There's no interesting mystery or enigma to Starlight...  All the cool things he does in the book... are cut out except for the bit where he impersonates a gent from England. There's no real relationship between Starlight and the boys... A real dull mess."

See also
 Cinema of Australia

References

External links

Robbery Under Arms at AustLit
Robbery Under Arms at Oz Movies
'Killing the Narrator: National Differences in Adaptations of Robbery Under Arms' by E Webby, National Library of Australia, 2002

1957 films
Films directed by Jack Lee
1957 Western (genre) films
British Western (genre) films
Films based on Robbery Under Arms
Films shot in Flinders Ranges
1950s English-language films
1950s British films